Wayne Ferreira was the defending champion but lost in the final 6–3, 6–4 against Michael Stich.

Seeds
The top eight seeds received a bye to the second round.

Draw

Finals

Top half

Section 1

Section 2

Bottom half

Section 3

Section 4

References

External links
 1993 Stella Artois Championships draw

Singles